The West Metro Education Program (WMEP) was a voluntary consortium of 11 urban and suburban school districts in the Minneapolis area of Minnesota. As an educational equity-focused collaborative for student success and educator growth, WMEP offered professional development, equity leadership and student programs to build capacity in the region. 

WMEP dissolved on June 30, 2018.

Known as Joint Powers School District 6069, member school districts of WMEP included:
 Brooklyn Center School District
 Columbia Heights School District
 Eden Prairie School District
 Edina Public Schools
 Hopkins Public Schools
 Minneapolis Public Schools
 Richfield Public Schools
 Robbinsdale Area Schools
 St. Anthony-New Brighton School District
 St. Louis Park School District
 Wayzata Public Schools

References

External links
WMEP website

2018 disestablishments in Minnesota
School districts in Minnesota